Christopher Anestos Kitsos (February 11, 1928 – June 7, 2004) was an American professional baseball player. Although he appeared in only one inning of one Major League Baseball game (for the  Chicago Cubs), Kitsos had a 13-year (1947–1959) career in the minor leagues, playing in 1,618 games, primarily as a shortstop.

Kitsos' MLB appearance came on April 21, 1954 against the Milwaukee Braves at County Stadium. He played shortstop (spelling Eddie Miksis, who pinch hit for starter Ernie Banks, in his first full MLB season) in the bottom of the eighth inning with the Cubs trailing 7–3.  He retired two of three Brave batters that inning (Johnny Logan and Warren Spahn) on ground ball outs as Cub pitcher Jim Davis got the side in order. However, the Cubs also were retired in order in the top of the ninth, denying Kitsos a Major League plate appearance. He spent the rest of the 1954 season, and his career, in the minor leagues.

Kitos died from lung cancer in Mobile, Alabama in 2004 at the age of 76.

References

External links

1928 births
2004 deaths
Asheville Tourists players
Baseball players from New York (state)
Beaumont Exporters players
Chicago Cubs players
Deaths from cancer in Alabama
Deaths from lung cancer
Des Moines Bruins players
Fort Worth Cats players
Johnstown Johnnies players
Kingston Dodgers players
Lancaster Red Roses players
Los Angeles Angels (minor league) players
Major League Baseball shortstops
Miami Sun Sox players
Mobile Bears players
New Orleans Pelicans (baseball) players
Sportspeople from Mobile, Alabama
Pueblo Bruins players
Springfield Cubs players
Thomasville Dodgers players
James Madison High School (Brooklyn) alumni